Dale Thompson (born 1963) is an American singer. In 1983, along with his younger brother Troy, Dale formed the band Matrix and began writing original material. In 1986, Matrix was signed to a record deal and changed their name to Bride. Between 1986 and 2013, Thompson released 14 studio albums with Bride, along with five solo albums, before disbanding the group, with the brothers remaining the only two original members throughout Bride's career. A lyric tenor in Bride's early days, Thompson was known for his powerful and stratospheric voice, as is evidenced on such early Bride songs as "Evil That Men Do", "Hell No" and "Here Comes the Bride".

Thompson was into boxing and weightlifting, and currently holds two Kentucky bench press records. He has the title as the "Strongest Man in Kentucky."

Thompson and his brother retired Bride in 2013, after releasing the band's 14th and final album, Incorruptible.

Thompson currently lives in New Zealand and has a new musical project, "The World Will Burn", with Kentucky-based multi-instrumentalist Alan Zaring. The duo has released their debut album, Severity. He also formed a new band called "N.O.G.", meaning "No Other God". The band are currently finishing recording their first album for a 2018 release.

In 2018, Thompson announced a new project with Tiago James De Souza of Hand of Fire, called Perpetual Paranoia. They have describe their style as heavy, but not thrash metal.

In December 2018 Thompson joined Myles Barfield in "Dabster Gentlemen", originally an instrumental band who builds their music with an acoustic foundation. While in this band Thompson was able to explore Jazz, Blues, Folk, Country, R&B, Soul as well as a number of various styles of music he likely never would have been able to do. While in Dabster Gentlemen, Thompson recorded daily for a year, developing a catalog of albums that would be released yearly over the next ten years. In mid-2019 Thompson began a second concept project with Myles called "Haunted no More". The duo's goal was to work deep into emotions, pain and tragedy. They wanted to create music that made people think, and take the listener on a journey ending in hope. As with Dabster Gentlemen, the band worked tirelessly recording enough songs to release an album a year for at least six years. In both of these bands, Thompson performed all vocals as well as wrote all lyrics showing a side of himself that was open and unhindered, revealing a vulnerable honesty in each song as never before.

Presidential candidate nomination 

Thompson sought the Constitution Party nomination in the 2008 campaign for president of the United States. He dropped out around March 19, 2007, but stated "If the Lord wills maybe we can seriously look at 2012." However, he did not run for president in 2012.

Personal beliefs 

Thompson considers himself a committed Christian and universalist and according to Scott Waters of Ultimatum, Thompson's lyrical approach of universalism has been featured most prominently in "This is it" and "Skin for Skin." In the album Skin for Skin, Thompson's lyrics claim a greater Universalist view than previous releases, most notably in the song "End of Days", where the lyrics contain what is considered Thompson's most outward implication of Universalism with the lyrics, "Every man, women and child followed Adam to the grave. Your flesh he will destroy that your spirit will be saved...concluded them all in unbelief, he'll have mercy on everyone, by His grace and peace the Spirit and the Bride say come".

Despite his Universalism and several accusations that he is no longer a Christian, Thompson has stated that he is a devout Christian and does believe in a Hell, though he has not staked a clear position on other doctrinal issues such as speaking in tongues, divine healing, foot washing, and the rapture, as he believes the teachings of Christ are the most important areas of Christian Faith. He argues that the Bible does not require anything other than Believing in Christ's teachings. Thompson is often critical of many Christian churches and denominations, particularly fundamentalism, as they often refer to Christian Universalist beliefs as heresy.

Criticism of Cornerstone Festival 

Thompson was critical of Cornerstone Festival, stating "the Cornerstone staff was easily freaked out by us. They would have some bizarre goth band play or some punk band that said crazy things and put on weird shows and invite them back year after year... while we preached boldly from the stage and basically was blacklisted from the festival. Sorry state of affairs."

Discography 

With Bride

Studio albums
Show No Mercy (1986)
Live to Die (1988)
Silence Is Madness (1989)
Kinetic Faith (1991)
Snakes in the Playground (1992)
Scarecrow Messiah (1994)
Drop (1995)
The Jesus Experience (1997)
Oddities (1998)
Fist Full of Bees (2001)
This Is It (2003)
Skin for Skin (2006)
Tsar Bomba (2009)
Incorruptible (2013)
Snake Eyes (2018)
Here Is Your God (2020)

Compilations and other releases
End of the Age (1990)
God Gave Rock 'n' Roll to You (1993)
Lost Reels I (1994)
Lost Reels II (1994)
I Predict a Clone a tribute to Steve Taylor – various artists (1994)
Shotgun Wedding: 11 No. 1 Hits and Mrs. (1995)
Lost Reels III (1997)
Bride Live! Volume I (1999)
Bride Live Volume II Acoustic (2000)
Best of Bride (2000)
Live at Cornerstone 2001 (2001)
The Matrix Years / Lost Reels (2001)
The Organic Years (2002)
Raw 7-track demo (2003)

Solo albums
 Speak into the Machine (1994)
 Dale Thompson and the Religious Overtones (1995)
 Testimony – Dale Thompson and The Kentucky Cadillacs (1998)
 Acoustic Daylight (1998)
 Unbridled (2002)

With the World Will Burn
Severity (2016)
RuiNation (2017)
Nothings As Real As It Seems (2019)

With Perpetual Paranoia
The Reapers (2018)
Between the Altar and the Cross (2019)
Hell Fest (2021)
The Wave (2023)

With Dabster Gentlemen
Death or Life (2018)
Answers (2020)
The Sun is Up (2021)

With Swingle and Thompson Ordained
The Thunder That Rocks The World (2020)
Firestorm (2021)

With No Other God
Take it By Storm (2019)

With Haunted No More
Vol. I (2019)
Vol. II (2020)

With The Thomas Thompson Earth Project
Dreamland Lovecraft (2020)
7 Angels 1 Sad Devil (2020)
Systematic Brain Drain (2021)

With Dominus Meus
DM1 (2020)
DMII (2021)

With Iron 501
Sgt. Reckless (2021)
Night Witches (2022)
Underground Railroad (2023)

With We Are Resolute
Shine the Light (2020)
Only Human (2022)

With The Reconciled
Skin & Bones (2022)

With Sovereign Cross
Bow to the Light (2021)

With Not Of This World
Never Forget (2022)

References

External links 
 About Bride and its members – URL. Retrieved September 16, 2006.
 Overview of Bride.. Retrieved October 31, 2007.
 
 The World Will Burn Dale Thompson's new musical project.

American heavy metal singers
Christian metal musicians
American Christian universalists
1963 births
Living people
American performers of Christian music
Kentucky Constitutionalists
Musicians from Louisville, Kentucky
Singers from Kentucky
Songwriters from Kentucky
Rock musicians from Kentucky